The dependency ratio is an age-population ratio of those typically not in the labor force (the dependent part ages 0 to 14 and 65+) and those typically in the labor force (the productive part ages 15 to 64). It is used to measure the pressure on the productive population.

Consideration of the dependency ratio is essential for governments, economists, bankers, business, industry, universities and all other major economic segments which can benefit from understanding the impacts of changes in population structure.  A low dependency ratio means that there are sufficient people working who can support the dependent population. A lower ratio could allow for better pensions and better health care for citizens.  A higher ratio indicates more financial stress on working people and possible political instability. While the strategies of increasing fertility and of allowing immigration especially of younger working age people have been formulas for lowering dependency ratios, future job reductions through automation may impact the effectiveness of those strategies.

Formula
In published international statistics, the dependent part usually includes those under the age of 15 and over the age of 64. The productive part makes up the population in between, ages 15 – 64. It is normally expressed as a percentage:

As the ratio increases there may be an increased burden on the productive part of the population to maintain the upbringing and pensions of the economically dependent. This results in direct impacts on financial expenditures on things like social security, as well as many indirect consequences.

The (total) dependency ratio can be decomposed into the child dependency ratio and the aged dependency ratio:

Total dependency ratio by regions

Projections
Below is a table constructed from data provided by the UN Population Division.  It shows a historical ratio for the regions shown for the period 1950 - 2010.  Columns to the right show projections of the ratio.  Each number in the table shows the total number of dependents (people aged 0–14 plus people aged over 65) per hundred people in the workforce (number of people aged 15–64). The number can also be expressed as a percent.  So, the total dependency ratio for the world in 1950 was 64.8% of the workforce.

As of 2010, Japan and Europe had high aged dependency ratios (that is over 65 as % of workforce) compared to other parts of the world. In Europe 2010, for every adult aged 65 and older there are approximately four working age adults (15-64); This ratio (one:four, or 25%) is expected to decrease to one:two, or 50%, by 2050. An aging population is caused by a decline in fertility and longer life expectancy. The average life expectancy of males and females are expected to increase from 79 years in 1990 to 82 years in 2025. The dependency amongst Japan residents aged 65 and older is expected to increase which will have a major impact on Japan's economy.

Inverse 
The inverse of the dependency ratio, the inverse dependency ratio can be interpreted as how many independent workers have to provide for one dependent person (pension & expenditure on children).

Measures of dependency

Old age dependency ratio 
A high dependency ratio can cause serious problems for a country if a large proportion of a government's expenditure is on health, social security & education, which are most used by the youngest and the oldest in a population. The fewer people of working age, the fewer the people who can support schools, retirement pensions, disability pensions and other assistances to the youngest and oldest members of a population, often considered the most vulnerable members of society. The ratio of old (usually retired) to young working people is called old age dependency ratio (OADR) or just dependency ratio.

Nevertheless, the dependency ratio ignores the fact that the 65+ are not necessarily dependent (an increasing proportion of them are working) and that many of those of 'working age' are actually not working. Alternatives have been developed', such as the 'economic dependency ratio', but they still ignore factors such as increases in productivity and in working hours. Worries about the increasing (demographic) dependency ratio should thus be taken with caution.

Labor force dependency ratio 
The labor force dependency ratio (LFDR) is a more specific metric than the old age dependency ratio because it measures the ratio of the older retired population to the employed population at all ages (or the ratio of the inactive population to the active population at all ages).

Productivity weighted labor force dependency ratio 
While OADRs or LFDRs provide reasonable measures of dependency, they do not account for the fact that middle-aged and educated workers are usually the most productive. Hence the productivity weighted labor force dependency ratio (PWLFDR) may be a better metric to determine dependency. The PWLFDR is the ratio of inactive population (all ages) to active population (all ages), weighted by productivity for education level. Interestingly, while OADRs or LFDRs can change substantially, the PWLFDR is predicted to remain relatively constant in countries like China for the next couple of decades. PWLFDR assessments recommend to invest in education and life-long learning and child health to maintain social stability even when populations age.

Migrant labor dependency ratio 
Migrant labor dependency ratio (MLDR) is used to describe the extent to which the domestic population is dependent upon migrant labor.

Impact on savings and housing markets 
High dependency ratios can lead to long-term economic changes within the population such as saving rates, investment rates, the housing markets, and the consumption patterns. Typically, workers will start to increase their savings as they grow closer to retirement age, but this will eventually affect their long-term interest rates due to the retirement population increasing and the fertility rates decreasing. If the demographic population continues to follow this trend, their savings will decrease while their long-term interest rates increase. Due to the saving rates decreasing, the investment rate will prevent economic growth because there will be less funding for investment projects. There is a correlation between labor force and housing markets, so when there is a high age-dependency ratio in a country, the investments in housing markets will decrease since the labor force is decreasing due to a high dependency population.

Solutions
Low dependency ratios promote economic growth while high dependency ratios decrease economic growth due to the large amounts of dependents that pay little to no taxes. A solution to decreasing the dependency ratio within a country is to promote immigration for younger people. This will stimulate a higher economic growth because the working-age population will grow in number if more young adults migrate into their country.

The increase in the involvement of women in the work force has contributed to the working-age population which complements the dependency ratio for a country. Encouraging women to work will help decrease the dependency ratio. Because more women are getting higher education, it is less likely for them to have children, causing the fertility rates to decrease as well.

Using productivity weighted labor force dependency ratio (PWLFDR) suggests that even an aging or decreasing population can maintain a stable support for the dependent (primarily ageing) population by increasing its productivity. A consequence from PWLFDR assessments is the recommendation to invest in education and life-long learning, child health, and to support disabled workers.

Dependency ratios based on the demographic transition model 
The age-dependency ratio can determine which stage in the Demographic Transition Model a certain country is in. The dependency ratio acts like a rollercoaster when going through the stages of the Demographic Transition Model. During stages 1 and 2, the dependency ratio is high due to significantly high crude birth rates putting pressure onto the smaller working-age population to take care of all of them. In stage 3, the dependency ratio starts to decrease because fertility and mortality rates start to decrease which shows that the proportion of adults to the young and elderly are much larger in this stage. In stages 4 and 5, the dependency ratio starts to increase once again as the working-age population retires. Because fertility rates caused the younger population to decrease, once they grow up and start working, there will be more pressure for them to take care of the previous working-age population that just retired since there will be more young and elderly people than working-age adults during that time period. The population structure of a country is an important factor for determining the economic status of their country. Japan is a great example of an aging population. They have a 1:4 ratio of people 65 years and older. This causes trouble for them because there is not enough people in the working-age population to support all of the elders. Rwanda is another example of a population that struggles with a younger population (also known as the "youth bulge"). Both of these countries are struggling with high dependency ratios even though both countries are on opposite stages of the Demographic Transition Model.

Criticism
The dependency ratio has been criticized for ignoring that many older adults are employed, and many younger adults are not, and obscuring other trends such as improving health for older people that might make older people less economically dependent. For this reason, the Office of the United Nations High Commissioner for Human Rights has characterized the metric as ageist, and recommends avoiding its use. Alternative metrics, such as the economic dependency ratio (defined as the number of unemployed and retired people divided by the number of workers) do address this oversimplification, but ignore the effects of productivity and work hours.

See also 
List of countries by dependency ratio
Demographic economics
 Economic collapse
 Employment-to-population ratio
 Generational accounting
 Pensions crisis
 Sub-replacement fertility
 Societal collapse

Case studies:
 Ageing of Europe
 Aging of Japan

References

External links 
Old Age dependency Ratios in Europe
Definition and Forecasts for Dependency Ratios
The Risk Pool, Malcolm Gladwell, The New Yorker, 8/23/2006

Demographic economic problems
Macroeconomic problems
Retirement
Ageing
Government budgets
Ratios